Zhang Wenjing is a Chinese para-alpine skier who competed at the 2022 Winter Paralympics.

Career
Wenjing represented China at the 2022 Winter Paralympics and won a silver medal in the slalom and bronze medals in the Super-G and giant slalom sitting events.

References 

Living people
Place of birth missing (living people)
Chinese female alpine skiers
Alpine skiers at the 2022 Winter Paralympics
Medalists at the 2022 Winter Paralympics
Paralympic silver medalists for China
Paralympic bronze medalists for China
Paralympic medalists in alpine skiing
Year of birth missing (living people)
21st-century Chinese women